Kim Dae-myung (born February 16, 1981) is a South Korean actor. He began his acting career in theater, then rose to fame in the television series Misaeng: Incomplete Life (2014), as well as Hospital Playlist (2020).

Filmography

Film

Television series

Television shows

Music video

Theater

Awards and nominations

References

External links 

 
 
 
 Kim Dae-myung at Prain TPC

1980 births
Living people
21st-century South Korean male actors
South Korean male film actors
South Korean male television actors
South Korean male musical theatre actors
South Korean male stage actors
South Korean male web series actors
Sungkyunkwan University alumni